The Nationalist Republican Alliance (abbreviated ARENA) is a conservative, right-wing political party of El Salvador. It was founded on 30 September 1981 by retired Salvadoran Army Major Roberto D'Aubuisson. It defines itself as a political institution constituted to defend the democratic, republican, and representative system of government, the social market economy system and nationalism.

ARENA controlled the National Assembly of El Salvador until 1985, and its party leader Alfredo Cristiani was elected to the presidency in 1989. ARENA controlled the presidency from 1989 until 2009. The party gained a plurality in the Legislative Assembly in 2012.

History 

The Nationalist Republican Alliance was founded on 30 September 1981 during the Salvadoran Civil War. The party's membership at the time of its establishment consisted of primarily members of the Salvadoran Nationalist Movement (MNS) and the National Broad Front (FAN) who were dissatisfied with the government of the ruling Revolutionary Government Junta (JRG), as well of the preceding government of the National Conciliation Party (PCN). Its founding leader was Roberto D'Aubuisson, a former major in the Salvadoran Army who was most well-known for commanding various death squads and ordering the assassination of Archbishop Óscar Romero in 1980. At the time, ARENA was considered to be a far-right political party.

The party arose in response to "the insurgency of the Farabundo Martí National Liberation Front, FMLN, a group that united peasant farmers, unionists and intellectuals, which tried, through arms, to overthrow the dictatorship and to install a state regime inspired by the governments of revolutionary Cuba and Sandinista Nicaragua".

The ideology the party claims to believe in is a system of democratic and representative government, emphasizing individual rights, the family as the nucleus of society and the respect for private property.

In February 2007, three ARENA politicians were murdered in Guatemala, including Eduardo D'Aubuisson, the son of party founder Roberto D'Aubuisson, in what was considered by the police as a crime related to drugs.

In 2009, ARENA took out a full-page ad in a Salvadorean newspaper calling on President Mauricio Funes to recognise the interim Honduran government of Roberto Micheletti installed after the military had expelled President Manuel Zelaya.

On 21 July 2022, Gustavo López Davidson, the leader of ARENA from August 2019 to February 2020, committed suicide amidst an ongoing investigation against him for embezzlement and arms trafficking.

Structure 

The highest authority of the party ARENA is the Comité Ejecutivo Nacionalista (COENA, "Nationalist Executive Committee"), which consists of 13 members. The members must be re-elected annually through the General Assembly of ARENA members.

In addition to the COENA, there are 14 Directors-in-Chief, one for each department and departmental councils called "Juntas Directivas Conjuntas" to coordinate political work in their respective department. In each department, a director is chosen who works with a specific member of COENA. The director's role is to organize and co-ordinate electoral campaigns and help the councils form party structures in the municipalities of their departments.

On 19 February 2013, Jorge Velado assumed the position as president of COENA, in a party leadership shake-up aimed at re-energizing a stale organization tainted by its association with the violent death squads of the 1980s, widespread corruption and the switch to the U.S. dollar as the national currency.

Electoral record 

At the legislative elections held on 16 March 2003, the party won 32.0% of the popular vote and 27 out of 84 seats in the Legislative Assembly. ARENA's successful candidate in El Salvador's 2004 presidential election was Antonio Saca. On 21 March 2004, Saca defeated Schafik Hándal, the candidate of the left-wing Farabundo Martí National Liberation Front (FMLN), by a margin of 58% to 36% with 70% turnout. He was sworn in as president the following 1 June.

In the 12 March 2006 legislative election, the party won 39.4% of the popular vote and 32 out of 84 seats. At the 18 January 2009 legislative elections, the party received 38.55% of the vote, and again won 32 of the 84 seats.

On 15 March 2009, ARENA candidate Rodrigo Ávila lost the presidential election to Mauricio Funes of the FMLN. After elections, the party president was changed to Alfredo Cristiani.

On 9 March 2014 Salvador Sánchez Cerén of FMLN narrowly defeated the ARENA candidate Norman Quijano by 0.2% in a run-off vote in a controversial election.

ARENA also lost both 2019 presidential election and 2021 legislative election dominated by Nuevas Ideas, the party of current president Nayib Bukele.

Electoral history

Presidential elections

Elected presidents

Legislative Assembly elections

Current deputies

References

Citations

Bibliography

External links 

 Official website 
 Youth wing website 
 Rodrigo Ávila's website 

1981 establishments in North America
Anti-communist parties
International Democrat Union member parties
Nationalist parties in North America
Political parties established in 1981
Political parties in El Salvador
Salvadoran Civil War
Salvadoran nationalism